The seventh season of Matlock originally aired in the United States on ABC with a two hour season premiere from November 5, 1992 through May 6, 1993.

Cast

Main 
 Andy Griffith as Ben Matlock
 Brynn Thayer as Leanne McIntyre
 Daniel Roebuck as Cliff Lewis
 Clarence Gilyard as Conrad McMasters

Cast notes
 Brynn Thayer and Daniel Roebuck joined the cast this season
 Clarence Gilyard, Jr. departed as a regular at the end of the season, but appeared once more early in Season 8. For most of Gilyard's final season, he had been absent in a lot of episodes
 Clarence Gilyard Jr. was absent for 12 episodes
 Daniel Roebuck was absent for 11 episodes
 Brynn Thayer was absent for 1 episode

Episodes

References

External links 
 

1992 American television seasons
1993 American television seasons
07